Whitefriar or Akrill's Court is a 16th century timber-framed building in Lincoln. It now has a late 20th century shop front, but the timber-framed building survives with the southern front facing the narrow Akrill’s passage, on the east side of the High Street and just to the south of the railway crossing.

History

Surprisingly little is known about this building. The name Akrill refers to a baker who owned the property in the early part of the 19th century. Padley, who made scaled drawings of the buildings in 1851, said that  traditionally it was thought to be part of the White or Carmelite Friary in Lincoln. Adjacent to it at the east end was a small stone building with a Norman arch. As the Carmelite friary has now been shown by archaeological excavation to have been under St Mark's Station, on the opposite side of the High Street, it is unlikely that the building was associated with the friary. It has been alternatively suggested that the Whitefriars was the half-timbered vicarage of St Mary le Wigford church, but there is documentary evidence that in 1563 it was owned by Arthur Hall, an important Grantham merchant – this appears to be the same Arthur Hall who was the MP for Grantham. The building may have been a speculative commercial venture, attracting superior tenants who would sell from the ground floor chamber and live with their family on the first floor. Restoration work was undertaken to the building in 1963.

Description
Originally a house dating from the 15th century. The facade faces to the south in a narrow alley-way and the building is at a right angle to the High Street.  It has a close studded timber frame of four bays  with rendered nogging and a plain tile roof. The first floor is  jettied and is coved (curved) outwards with eaves above. South side has moulded uprights. Above, two square wooden oriels on moulded brackets and a 4-light window with wooden mullions and gothic tracery The interior has stud walls with jowled bay posts, two of them with arch braces, and arch braces to the spine beams. Principal rafter roof with collars and spine beam. Two  stud walls without nogging.

Literature
Antram N (revised), Pevsner N & Harris J, (1989), The Buildings of England: Lincolnshire, Yale University Press. pg 525.
Padley J.S. (1851) Selections from the ancient monastic ecclesiastical and domestic edifices of Lincolnshire, Lincoln 
Stocker D. (ed) (2016), Vernacular Architecture Group, Spring Conference 2016: Lincolnshire, March 29th to April 1st 2016, Society for Lincolnshire History and Archaeology.

References

See also - Medieval Domestic Architecture in Lincoln
John of Gaunt’s Palace, Lincoln

Buildings and structures in Lincoln, England
Houses in Lincolnshire